Cubiceps pauciradiatus is a species of fish in the family Nomeidae.

References 

Nomeidae
Fish described in 1872